Dan Bartel is an American politician from Montana. He is a Republican who represented District 29 in the Montana House of Representatives, and now serves District 15 in the Montana Senate.

Political career 
Bartel was first elected to represent District 29 in the Montana House of Representatives in 2016. He was re-elected in 2018 and again in 2020.

Bartel currently sits on the following committees:
 General Government (Chair)
 Appropriations

Electoral record

References 

Living people
21st-century American politicians
Republican Party members of the Montana House of Representatives
People from Lewistown, Montana
1957 births